Clyde Williams Field was an outdoor stadium on the campus of Iowa State University in Ames, Iowa. It was the home of the Iowa State Cyclones football and track and field teams.

It was originally built in 1914–15, just south of the recently completed State Gym. It originally held 5,000 spectators, but expansions in 1925, 1930, 1932, 1961 and 1966 brought the final capacity up to approximately 35,000. The stadium was the home of the Cyclones football team from its completion until 1975, when Jack Trice Stadium opened in the newly built Iowa State Center complex to the south of the main campus. Clyde Williams Field was razed in 1978. The site is now occupied by Eaton and Martin Halls, two residence halls constructed in 2002 and 2004, respectively.

The stadium was known as State Field until October 1938 when it was renamed for Clyde Williams, coach and athletic director at the school who died in March 1938.

Football attendance

References

External links
 Iowa State Special Collections photo of Clyde Williams Field
 Iowa State Special Collections photo of Clyde Williams Field
 https://www.flickr.com/photos/isuspecialcollections/sets/72157603913632060/with/2267544540/
 Clyde Williams Field gate from Iowa State University Facilities Planning & Management

Defunct college football venues
Iowa State Cyclones football venues
American football venues in Iowa
Defunct sports venues in Iowa
1914 establishments in Iowa
1975 disestablishments in Iowa
Sports venues demolished in 1978